Justin Berna is an American football player and coach.  He is the head football coach at West Hills College Coalinga in  Coalinga, California.  Berna served as the head football coach at Avila University in Kansas City, Missouri from 2011 to 2016.

References

External links
 West Hills College Coalinga profile

Year of birth missing (living people)
Living people
Avila Eagles football coaches
Lindenwood Lions football coaches
Lindenwood Lions football players
MacMurray Highlanders football coaches
West Hills Falcons football players
Junior college football coaches in the United States
Junior college football players in the United States